Diethyl dithiophosphoric acid, sometimes mistakenly called diethyl dithiophosphate, is the organophosphorus compound with the formula (C2H5O)2PS2H.  It is the processor for production of the organophosphate insecticide Terbufos. Although samples can appear dark, it is a colorless liquid.

It is prepared by treating phosphorus pentasulfide with ethanol:
P2S5  +  4 C2H5OH    →  2 (C2H5O)2PS2H  +  H2S

Reactions

Diethyl- and dimethyl dithiophosphoric acids react with bases. The results of this neutralization reaction are salts, e.g., ammonium diethyl dithiophosphate.

Diethyl dithiophosphoric acid reacts with zinc oxide to give zinc dithiophosphate, which is used as an oil additive:

ZnO  +  2 (C2H5O)2PS2H   →   [(C2H5O)2PS2]2Zn  +  H2O

See also
 Dimethyl dithiophosphoric acid

References 

Organothiophosphate esters
Ethyl esters